Ibrahim Abdullahi Danbaba(born January 1, 1960) is Nigerian politician and accountant, He is the Senator representing Sokoto South Senatorial District of Sokoto State at the 9th National Assembly.

Early life and education
Danbaba was born in Sabon Birni, Sokoto State, he attended Government Secondary School Gusan where he obtained his West African School Certificate (WAEC) in 1979. He proceeded to the Advance Teachers College, Sokoto where he was awarded his NCE in 1976. He studied Management at the University of Sokoto and he graduated in 1981. He got is Advanced diploma in Accounting at the Loton College of Higher Education, United Kingdom in 1989.

Polictical career
Danbaba was the Deputy Governor of Sokoto State from 1999 to 2003.
He was elected as senator representing Sokoto south senatorial district in March 2015.
In June 2018, He defected to the People's Democratic Party.
On February 23, 2019 Shehu Tambuwal was elected as the senator representing Sokokto South senatorial district having polled 134,204 votes while Danbaba polled 112,546 votes.
In November, 2019, The Court of Appeal Sokoto Division returned Senator Ibrahim Danbaba as Senator to the National Assembly as Senator Shehu Tambuwal was removed from office following the reversal of judgement/dismissal of the petition by Election Petition Tribunal.

References

1953 births
Living people
Nigerian politicians